The BR Standard Class 4 2-6-0 is a class of steam locomotive designed by Robert Riddles for British Railways (BR). 115 locomotives were built to this standard.

Design and construction
The class was designed at the ex-LNER works at Doncaster which was also responsible for building 25 of the 115-strong class. The remaining 90 were split between Horwich and Derby Works.

The last in the series, No.76114, was also the final steam engine to be constructed at the 'Plant' (as Doncaster works was known). The Standard Four Mogul was essentially a standardised version of the LMS Ivatt Class 4, and was primarily intended for freight use.

Although a BR Standard, the 4 2-6-0 class did not have the same design of wheels as the Swindon-built 82XXX and 77XXX Class 3 engines which also had  driving wheels, yet all three locomotive classes share the same cylinder casting.

The cylinder covers of engines built early in the programme of construction were fitted with "screw-in" type pressure relief valves. From September 1955 revised cylinder covers were introduced for renewals incorporating "bolt-on" type pressure relief valves.

Operation
With its  diameter driving wheels this sixth of the BR standard designs was clearly biased towards freight working. An axle-loading of only  meant its route availability was virtually unrestricted. Batches were allocated to every BR region except the Western.

Eastern Region

The Eastern Region divided its 15 between two London depots. Five went to Stratford on the ex-Great Eastern section, and the remainder to the one-time Great Central depot at Neasden. Made redundant by dieselisation the Stratford engines were transferred to the Southern and arrived at Brighton. The Neasden engines also in due course departed the capital, in this case for Chester and ex-Cambrian Railways territory. One Eastern locomotive was 76034 which was fitted with a tablet catcher for running over the M&GN lines in East Anglia.

London Midland Region

Apart from a pair allocated to Leicester, most of the London Midland Region's batch of 15 spent their working lives in the Liverpool, Manchester and Preston areas. Some were allocated to the Nottingham area, and took over the working of the afternoon 16:45 fish train ex Grimsby from 4F 0-6-0s.

North Eastern Region

At first the North Eastern Region scattered its 13-strong allocation far and wide: Darlington, Gateshead, Hull, Sunderland and York. Later all were concentrated at either Kirkby Stephen or West Auckland to work over the Stainmore route whose viaducts had severe weight restrictions. Like their small cousins the 2MT 2-6-0 class the Moguls were ideal for working the line. They worked coal trains as well as passenger services and were a regular choice for excursions from Tyneside to the Lancashire coast resorts.

Scottish Region
Thirty-five units were allocated to the Scottish Region, used on the Waverley Line between Carlisle and Hawick. Others appeared on the 'Port Road' from Dumfries to Stranraer. The Scottish examples were mainly concentrated in Ayrshire and around Glasgow, and at one time Corkerhill depot was home to ten of the class. Five units were based in Aberdeen and three went to Thornton in Fife.

Southern Region

The Southern moguls (originally 37) were also concentrated in one area around Eastleigh, Southampton and Bournemouth. They were used between Portsmouth, Salisbury and Cardiff, Reading to Redhill, Brighton to Bournemouth and over the Swanage branch. Their most celebrated duty was the London Waterloo to Lymington boat train. However this had nothing to do with the engines' capabilities; it was simply that among tender engines only a 2-6-0 or 4-4-0 could fit on the turntable at Brockenhurst. In the last few years of steam operation on the 'Southern' a few examples were allocated to Guildford shed before moving on to Feltham shed in south-west London.

All 17 locomotives equipped with the BR1B high-sided tender were allocated to the Southern Region. The BR1B tender had a higher axle load than the locomotives.

Withdrawal

Accidents and incidents
On 23 September 1954, locomotive No. 76017 was hauling a freight train that overran signals and was derailed by trap points at  station, Hampshire.
In December 1957, locomotive No. 76016 was hauling a freight train that overran signals and was derailed by trap points at  station, Hampshire.
On 12 February 1960, locomotive No. 76026 was hauling a freight train that overran signals and was derailed by trap points at Whitchurch Town station.

Preservation
Four engines have survived into preservation, all four built at Horwich Works and rescued from Woodham Brothers scrapyard at Barry Island. Three members of the class have steamed so far in preservation but 76077 has yet to do so and is at present undergoing restoration from scrapyard condition. All three engines that have run in preservation have been on the main line, but only 76079 and 76084 have operated on the main line hauling railtours. On 13 October 2022, 76017 was moved by rail from its home at the Watercress Line to the Bluebell Railway.

76079's main career on the main line was when it was owned by Ian Riley in Bury, Lancashire, but it was eventually sold to the NYMR. After completion of its most recent overhaul in 2014 it once again has a main line certificate but is restricted between Battersby and Whitby on the Esk Valley Line. 76084, meanwhile, is certified to operate over the national network hauling railtours alongside passenger runs along the Bittern Line and the Esk Valley Line.

Models
The erstwhile Kitmaster company produced an unpowered polystyrene injection moulded model kit for 00 gauge. In late 1962, the Kitmaster brand was sold by its parent company (Rosebud Dolls) to Airfix, who transferred the moulding tools to their own factory; they re-introduced some of the former Kitmaster range, including this locomotive. In time, the moulding tools passed on to Dapol who have also produced the model kit.

Bachmann produces a ready-to-run model in both 00 and N gauge.

Sound
76079 Between Egton and Grosmont
76079 departing from Grosmont

Footnotes

Bibliography
A Detailed History of BR Standard Steam Locomotives, - Vol 2 - The 4-6-0 and 2-6-0 Classes. RCTS

External links

 
Southern E-group photo gallery
Website for the restoration and preservation of the "Forgotten Standard" 76077
Website of preserved loco 76084

 
4 2-6-0
2-6-0 locomotives
Railway locomotives introduced in 1952
Standard gauge steam locomotives of Great Britain